Gibbons may refer to:

 The plural of gibbon, an ape in the family Hylobatidae
 Gibbons (surname)
 Gibbons, Alberta
 Gibbons (automobile), a British light car of the 1920s
 Gibbons P.C., a leading American law firm headquartered in New Jersey
 Gibbons, a character from Tom Goes to the Mayor

See also
 Orlando Gibbons (1583–1625), an English composer
 Gibbons v. Ogden, an 1824 United States Supreme Court case
 Stanley Gibbons, a company specialising in postage stamps
 Cardinal Gibbons High School (Florida), a private high school in Fort Lauderdale, Florida
 Gibbon (disambiguation)
 Justice Gibbons (disambiguation)